Eek or EEK may refer to:

People 
 Karl Morten Eek (born 1988), Norwegian footballer
 Maria Magdalena Eek (1733–1800), Finnish pastry chef

Places 
 Eek, Alaska
 Eek Airport, Alaska
 Eek River, Alaska

Other uses 
 Estonian kroon, a former currency of Estonia
 Workers Revolutionary Party (Greece)
 Eek, a character in the animated television series Eek! The Cat
 E484K (nicknamed "Eek"), a variant of SARS-CoV-2 (the virus that causes COVID-19)

See also
 EKE (disambiguation)
 Eek-A-Mouse (born 1957), Jamaican reggae musician